The 1999 Pilot Pen Tennis singles was the singles event of the seventeenth edition of the final tournament in the US Open Series. Steffi Graf was the defending champion, but had retired after the TIG Classic.

Venus Williams defeated Lindsay Davenport in the final to win her first New Haven title.

Seeds

Draw

Finals

Top half

Bottom half

Qualifying

Seeds

Qualifiers

Qualifying draw

First qualifier

Second qualifier

Third qualifier

Fourth qualifier

Fifth qualifier

Sixth qualifier

Seventh qualifier

Eighth qualifier

External links
 ITF singles results page
 WTA draw archive

Singles
Pilot Pen Tennis - Singles
1999 Pilot Pen Tennis